Kalitva is a rural locality (a selo) in Alexeyevsky District, Belgorod Oblast, Russia. The population was 665 as of 2010. There are 3 streets.

Geography 
Kalitva is located 43 km southeast of Alexeyevka (the district's administrative centre) by road. Osadcheye is the nearest rural locality.

References 

Rural localities in Alexeyevsky District, Belgorod Oblast